EF Education is a yacht. She finished ninth in the 1997–98 Whitbread Round the World Race skippered by Christine Guillou.

Career
EF Education was designed by Bruce Farr and built by Richard Gilles and Tim Smythe.

She finished ninth in the 1997–98 Whitbread Round the World Race skippered by Christine Guillou.

References

Volvo Ocean Race yachts
Sailing yachts of Sweden
Volvo Ocean 60 yachts
1990s sailing yachts